Rock Lake is the name of several locations:

United States

 Rock Lake (White Cloud Mountains), Idaho
 Rock Lake (Lyon County, Minnesota)
 Rock Lake (Minnesota)
 Rock Lake (Wright County, Minnesota)
 Rock Lake Township, Lyon County, Minnesota
 Rock Lake (Arietta, Hamilton County, New York)
 Rock Lake, Indian Lake, New York
 Rock Lake Mountain, Benson, New York
 Rock Lake (Washington)
 Rock Lake (Wisconsin)

Canada
 Rock Lake (Alberta)
 Rock Lake (Manitoba)
 Rock Lake (electoral district), Manitoba
 Rock Lake (Ontario)
 Rock Lake (Algonquin Park)

See also
 Rock Lake Village, Kanawha County, West Virginia
 Rock Lake Middle School, Seminole County, Florida, U.S.
 Rock Lake Pool, a former swimming pool in West Virginia